WZQS is a radio station on 90.5 FM in Cullowhee, North Carolina, broadcasting to Jackson and Haywood counties in the western part of the state. It is owned by Blue Ridge Public Radio (BPR).

The facility is currently silent as a result of its acquisition by Blue Ridge, effective February 1, 2021, from Western Carolina University, under which it had operated as WWCU from 1977 to 2021. The university is in the process of rebuilding WWCU on a newer and higher-power license at 95.3 MHz. WZQS is being relocated to a new site.

On October 31, 2022, WZQS is scheduled to begin airing the programming of WCQS-HD2.

History

In 1977, Western Carolina University, which had maintained a carrier current station on campus since 1947, built and signed on WWCU at 90.5 FM. This student radio station broadcast from a main site on Cutoff Mountain, but the region's rough terrain impeded any expansion of the station's coverage area. After applying in 2010, WCU was awarded a construction permit to build a 95.3 FM station, licensed to Dillsboro and broadcasting from Brown Mountain, in 2015. This station began temporary service as WWOO, a simulcaster of WWCU, using a temporary  fiberglass mast, in 2018, and work began on the construction of a new permanent tower after that.

The 95.3 frequency had been used by a translator of BPR's WCQS, which was forced to move to another frequency. The university sold the WWCU facility to BPR in 2020 for $97,000, excluding the station's former booster.

References

Jackson County, North Carolina
ZQS
Radio stations established in 1977
1977 establishments in North Carolina
NPR member stations
North Carolina Public Radio